Oulu Swimming Pool is an indoor swimming pool in the Raksila neighbourhood in Oulu, Finland. It is the biggest of the three indoor swimming pools in Oulu and one of the biggest in Finland. The swimming pool designed by architect Risto Harju was completed in 1974.

The main pool is a  pool with eight lanes. In addition to the main pool there are a  lap pool, children's pools, a pool with a water slide and an activity pool. The diving tower has got platforms at ten, seven, five and three metres.

The pool came to national light in 2018, when an unknown man repeatedly defecated in the water.

References 

Raksila
Sports venues in Oulu
Swimming venues in Finland